Westfield Miranda (previously known as Miranda Fair) is a large shopping centre in the suburb of Miranda in Sutherland Shire of Sydney.

Transport 
The Cronulla line offers frequent services to Miranda Station located outside the centre.

Westfield Miranda has bus connections to St George and South Western Sydney, as well as routes to local surrounding suburbs within the Sutherland Shire. Most routes are operated by Transdev with two routes by Transit Systems. Maianbar Bundeena Bus Service operates one Friday trip to/from Bundeena.  All routes operate from Kiora Road with many also from the Kingsway. 

Westfield Miranda has multi-level car parks with 4,891 spaces.

History

Miranda Fair was officially opened on 16 March 1964 by then Premier of New South Wales Bob Heffron in front of 1600 guests. A highlight of the opening ceremony was the arrival of a helicopter to deliver newspapers. A special fireworks display was put on for the locals on that evening.

The 3.25 million pound ($93.5 million in today's dollars) centre was designed by Tomkins, Shaw & Evans Architects and was built on the former site of Fowler's brick pit. Miranda Fair was developed by Myer and Farmers and was the largest fully enclosed shopping centre in NSW. The centre held that title until Roselands opened a year later.

Miranda Fair featured a Farmer & Co department store on three levels, Woolworths supermarket and 18 speciality stores. It also had a child minding centre, playground and parking for 1100 cars. Miranda Library moved into the shopping centre in that year.

In 1969 Westfield Corporation purchased Miranda Fair from Myer for $10 million. Following this purchase Westfield lodged plans with Sutherland Council to expand the centre. The expanded centre was proposed to double the centre in size and would extend to Kingsway. Farmers would expand their existing store, a new supermarket, hardware store and discount department store were also part of the proposal.

The expansion plans were approved in November 1969 by the council. As part of this approval, Wandella Road would be upgraded from the Kingsway to President Avenue. This also included the construction of a road bridge over the Cronulla railway line. The final approval was given in early 1970.

In September 1971, the expansion was completed and Miranda Fair was renamed to Westfield Shoppingtown Miranda. This expansion made Westfield Miranda the first regional shopping centre in Sydney to have two department stores – Farmers and Grace Bros. Grace Bros traded on four levels. Woolworths expanded to become a Woolworths Family Centre which was a hypermarket consisting of Big W and Woolworths in the one store. Nock & Kirby was also added to the centre.

Westfield Miranda opened a new office tower in March 1972 as part of the expansion. The five storey office tower was facing the Kingsway and featured a large eight-pointed, slowly revolving star on its rooftop. Part of the heritage of the centre, and somewhat of a local landmark, the star was lit at night and unique to any Westfield shopping centre.

The success of Westfield Miranda and the increasing population of the Sutherland Shire in the 1970s led to Westfield to begin planning another expansion for the centre. In 1976 Farmers was rebranded as Myer. The expansion plans were lodged to the council however it was rejected. The plans were to extend the centre over the railway line and into Karimbla Road. In 1983 Myer purchased Grace Bros and made the decision to withdraw from New South Wales due to poor sales and the focus on growing the Grace Bros brand across the state. As Grace Bros was already a tenant in the centre, Myer decided to vacate its space. This allowed Westfield to subdivide the space and expand the centre. In mid 1983 Harvey Norman opened its store in the top floor of the Myer space which operated until 1995 when it relocated to the newly built Caringbah Super Centre.

This redevelopment caused controversy as Westfield gained approval to build the three-level car park next to Miranda Public School, with a road bridge over Wandella Road. This led to protests by parents and teachers of Miranda Public School to stop the car park extension, however it was unsuccessful. This expansion also created a land swap which resulted in the construction of a new council library and other community facilities on Wandella Road.

The first stage of expansion was completed on 17 April 1984 and included the relocation of Woolworths from level 2 into level 3 in the old Myer space. Stage 2 opened on 28 August 1984 and included BBC Hardware, Best & Less and Franklins and an international food court. Stage 3 opened on 25 March 1985 and featured a new Big W store on the old space of Woolworths space on level 2. The total number of shops in the centre had doubled to 160.

Miranda Library moved to its new premises on Wandella Road outside Westfield Miranda in 1985.

In 1990 Westfield planned another expansion of the centre after two decades purchasing sites in the block bounded by the Kingsway, Kiora Road, Urunga Parade and Jackson Avenue. On that site shops, offices, Miranda Police Station and the Miranda Congregational Church. For this expansion to proceed, Westfield purchased sites within Miranda to relocate the police station and Miranda Congregational Church. In 1991 Westfield commenced construction of the expansion. This was completed in stages with the full opening on 1 October 1992  and gave the centre 108,316 square metres (1,165,900 square feet) of retail space. The new stores that opened in the expansion included David Jones and Target. A new food court, restaurants and entertainment precinct opened. The food court featured 20 outlets including fast food restaurants such as McDonald's, Hungry Jack's, Subway and KFC. The entertainment precinct featured an eight screen Greater Union cinema complex on the basement level and a Tilt amusement arcade centre on level one next to the food court. The restaurant precinct was located on the ground level with an entrance to the cinema. By the late 1990s Tilt closed down and was replaced by Aldi and The Reject Shop.
Since these expansions, other shopping centres have been built and expanded, including Westfield Parramatta and Westfield Bondi Junction which then made Westfield Miranda the fourth largest Westfield shopping centre in Sydney. In December 2005 Westfield Miranda was valued at $481.6 million, up from $444.7 million in December 2004.

In early 2009, Sutherland Council approved plans to further upgrade the complex, which included demolition of the office tower and adding 100 additional speciality shops at a cost of $435 million. Myer lost its ground floor for a larger 'full-line'  Woolworths supermarket. The entrance has moved closer to the Kingsway and the centre expanded by approximately 19,000 square metres to 127,000 square metres of gross lettable area. Demolition of the areas around the office tower began in July 2013. The star which sat on top of the tower was knocked off in late July 2013 as the office tower it sat upon was demolished. This caused anger amongst locals who wanted the star saved and incorporated into the new development. However the  fig tree located outside the centre on Kingsway was saved and incorporated into the development. This development did feature a new facade above the centre which is made up of grey wall which is designed to resemble fish scales in homage to "the Sutherland Shire's beach culture". 

The first stage of the redevelopment consisting of the first floor opened on Thursday 16 October 2014. About 80 more shops and restaurants opened on Thursday 20 November 2014 while the official opening took place on Thursday, 27 November, with four days of celebrations. A new multi-screen Event Cinemas complex on level 4 opened on 2 April 2015. 

On 28 May 2015 Zara opened its fifth Sydney store in the centre outside Myer on level 3. Uniqlo opened on 6 June 2015 next to Zara. Apple opened its 22nd Australian store in the centre on 27 July 2015.

During the renovations when the new parking system came in, people who lived near Miranda Fair noted that shoppers and employees of Miranda Fair were increasingly parking in the streets to avoid paying the fees for parking in Miranda Fair. In February 2015, Westfield Miranda planned to reintroduce free parking for people with disability stickers in response to feedback that parking was difficult to find. In December 2015, Westfield Miranda extended its opening hours until midnight. In December 2016, to cope with Christmas demand, parking at Port Hacking High School was arranged for shoppers at Westfield Miranda.

On 8 April 2016 Sky Zone opened its second Sydney location on the former cinema space. The PLAYTIME arcade opened around that time on the former restaurant space which was rebranded to Timezone in November 2018. On 10 November 2019 Sky Zone closed its doors. It did not give a reason. In a statement released the decision was "due to external circumstances out of our team's control". 

Since the closure of Sky Zone, Scentre Group is currently working together with Funlab to explore options for a new entertainment concept in Westfield Miranda.

Tenants 
Westfield Miranda has 128,410m² of floor space. The major retailers include David Jones, Myer, Big W, Kmart, Aldi, Coles, Woolworths, Cotton On, Uniqlo, Zara, Apple, JB Hi-Fi, Rebel, Timezone and Event Cinemas. Target was a previous major retailer, it closed on 20 March 2021 and it was replaced with Kmart which opened on 12 April 2021 .

Incidents 

 On 23 March 2017, a woman fell from the roof of the centre and died around 8:20am. Police were investigating the causes behind the fall as there were no suspicious circumstances and a report was prepared for the Coroner. Part of the centre was closed while roadblocks were set up causing major delays in both directions as emergency services responded.
 On 9 April 2020, a woman went on a racial tirade yelling out abuse to Telstra workers. This incident occurred around 11am and the woman has since been charged.

References

External links
Westfield Miranda Official Website

Westfield Group
Shopping centres in Sydney
Shopping malls established in 1964
1964 establishments in Australia